This List of carbon capture and storage projects provides documentation of global, industrial-scale projects for carbon capture and storage. According to the Global CCS Institute, in 2020 some 40 million tons CO2 per year capacity of CCS was in operation with 50 million tons per year in development. The world emits about 38 billion tonnes of CO2 every year, so CCS captured about one thousandth of the 2020 total.

Algeria 
In Salah was an operational onshore gas field with CO2 injection. CO2 was separated from produced gas and reinjected into the Krechba geologic formation at a depth of 1,900m. Since 2004, about 3.8 Mt of CO2 has been captured during natural gas extraction and stored. Injection was suspended in June 2011 due to concerns about the integrity of the seal, fractures and leakage into the caprock, and movement of CO2 outside of the Krechba hydrocarbon lease.

Australia 

In the early 2020s the government allocated over A$300 million for CCS both onshore and offshore.

Canada 
Canadian governments committed $1.8 billion fund CCS projects over the 2008-2018 period. The main programs are the federal government's Clean Energy Fund, Alberta's Carbon Capture and Storage fund, and the governments of Saskatchewan, British Columbia, and Nova Scotia. Canada works closely with the United States through the U.S.–Canada Clean Energy Dialogue launched by the Obama administration in 2009.

Alberta 
Alberta committed $170 million in 2013/2014 – and a total of $1.3 billion over 15 years – to fund two large-scale CCS projects.

The CAN $1.2 billion Alberta Carbon Trunk Line Project (ACTL), pioneered by Enhance Energy, became fully operational in June 2020. It is now the world's largest carbon capture and storage system consisting of a 240 km pipeline that collects CO2 industrial emissions from the Agrium fertilizer plant and North West Sturgeon Refinery in Alberta. The capture is then delivered to the matured Clive oil reservoir for use in EOR (enhanced oil recovery) and permanent storage. At full capacity, it can capture 14.6 million tonnes of CO2 per year. For perspective, that translates into capturing CO2 from 2.6 million cars plus.

The Quest Carbon Capture and Storage Project was developed by Shell for use in the Athabasca Oil Sands Project. It is cited as being the world's first commercial-scale CCS project. Construction began in 2012 and ended in 2015. The capture unit is located at the Scotford Upgrader in Alberta, Canada, where hydrogen is produced to upgrade bitumen from oil sands into synthetic crude oil. The steam methane units that produce the hydrogen emit CO2 as a byproduct. The capture unit captures the CO2 from the steam methane unit using amine absorption technology, and the captured CO2 is then transported to Fort Saskatchewan where it is injected into a porous rock formation called the Basal Cambrian Sands. From 2015 to 2018, the project stored 3 Mt CO2 at a rate of 1 Mtpa.

Saskatchewan

Boundary Dam Power Station Unit 3 Project 
Boundary Dam Power Station, owned by SaskPower, is a coal fired station originally commissioned in 1959. In 2010, SaskPower committed to retrofitting the lignite-powered Unit 3 with a carbon capture unit. The project was completed in 2014. The retrofit utilized a post-combustion amine absorption technology. The captured CO2 was to be sold to Cenovus to be used for Enhanced Oil Recovery (EOR) in Weyburn field. Any CO2 not used for EOR was planned to be used by the Aquistore project and stored in deep saline aquifers. Many complications kept Unit 3 and this project from operating as much as expected, but between August 2017 – August 2018, Unit 3 was online for 65%/day on average. The project has a nameplate capacity of capture of 1 Mtpa. The other units are to be phased out by 2024. The future of the one retrofitted unit is unclear.

Great Plains Synfuel Plant and Weyburn-Midale Project 
The Great Plains Synfuel Plant, owned by Dakota Gas, is a coal gasification operation that produces synthetic natural gas and various petrochemicals from coal. The plant began operation in 1984, while CCS began in 2000. In 2000, Dakota Gas retrofitted the plant and planned to sell the CO2 to Cenovus and Apache Energy, for EOR in the Weyburn and Midale fields in Canada. The Midale fields were injected with 0.4 Mtpa and the Weyburn fields are injected with 2.4 Mtpa for a total injection capacity of 2.8 Mtpa. The Weyburn-Midale Carbon Dioxide Project (or IEA GHG Weyburn-Midale CO2 Monitoring and Storage Project), was conducted there. Injection continued even after the study concluded. Between 2000 and 2018, over 30 Mt CO2 was injected.

China 
As of 2019 coal accounted for around 60% of China's energy production. The majority of CO2 emissions come from coal-fired power plants or coal-to-chemical processes (e.g. the production of synthetic ammonia, methanol, fertilizer, natural gas, and CTLs). According to the IEA, around 385 out of China's 900 gigawatts of coal-fired power capacity are near locations suitable for CCS. As of 2017 three CCS facilities are operational or in late stages of construction, drawing CO2 from natural gas processing or petrochemical production. At least eight more facilities are in early planning and development, most of which target power plant emissions, with an injection target of EOR.

China's largest carbon capture and storage plant at Guohua Jinjie coal power station was completed in January 2021. The project is expected to prevent 150,000 tons of carbon dioxide emission annually at a 90% capture rate.

CNPC Jilin Oil Field 
China's first carbon capture project was the Jilin oil field in Songyuan, Jilin Province. It started as a pilot EOR project in 2009, and developed into a commercial operation for the China National Petroleum Corporation (CNPC). The final development phase completed in 2018. The source of CO2 is the nearby Changling gas field, from which natural gas with about 22.5% is extracted. After separation at the natural gas processing plant, the CO2 is transported to Jilin via pipeline and injected for a 37% enhancement in oil recovery at the low-permeability oil field. At commercial capacity, the facility currently injects 0.6 Mt CO2 per year, and it has injected a cumulative total of over 1.1 million tonnes over its lifetime.

Sinopec Qilu Petrochemical CCS Project 
Sinopec is developing a carbon capture unit whose first phase was to be operational in 2019. The facility is located in Zibo City, Shandong Province, where a fertilizer plant produces CO2 from coal/coke gasification. CO2 is to be captured by cryogenic distillation and will be transported via pipeline to the nearby Shengli oil field for EOR. Construction of the first phase began by 2018, and was expected to capture and inject 0.4 Mt CO2 per year. The Shengli oil field is the destination for CO2.

Yanchang Integrated CCS Project 
Yanchang Petroleum is developing carbon capture facilities at two coal-to-chemical plants in Yulin City, Shaanxi Province. The first capture plant is capable of capturing 50,000 tonnes per year and was finished in 2012. Construction on the second plant started in 2014 and was expected to be finished in 2020, with a capacity of 360,000 tonnes per year. This CO2 will be transported to the Ordos Basin, one of China's largest coal, oil, and gas-producing regions with a series of low- and ultra-low permeability oil reservoirs. Lack of water has limited the use of water for EOR, so the CO2 increase production.

Germany 
The mini pilot plant was run by an Alstom-built oxy-fuel boiler and is also equipped with a flue gas cleaning facility to remove fly ash and sulfur dioxide. The Swedish company Vattenfall AB invested some €70 million in the two-year project, which began operation 9 September 2008. The power plant, which is rated at 30 megawatts, was a pilot project to serve as a prototype for future full-scale power plants. 240 tonnes a day of CO2 were being trucked  to be injected into an empty gas field. Germany's BUND group called it a "fig leaf". For each tonne of coal burned, 3.6 tonnes of CO2 was produced. The CCS program at Schwarze Pumpe ended in 2014 due to nonviable costs and energy use.

As of 2007, the German utility RWE operated a pilot-scale CO2 scrubber at the lignite-fired Niederaußem power station built in cooperation with BASF (supplier of detergent) and Linde engineering.

Japan 
The Tomakomai CCS Demonstration Project is an ongoing project led by Japan CCS Co., Ltd. (JCCS) in Tomakomai, Hokkaido prefecture. Funded by METI and commissioned by NEDO, JCCS has been leading CCS-related researches, including CO2 capture, injection and geological measurements at its Tomakomai site since 2012, although CO2 injection has been concluded since November 22, 2019 after reaching 300,012 tons of injected CO2, slightly above the initially proposed 300,000 tons.

The source of the CO2 was Idemitsu Kosan's nearby oil refinery, which was connected to the Tomakomai CCS site via an 1.4km (0.87mi) pipeline. After amine gas treating a CO2 purity of 99% or higher has been achieved, which was then sent to the injection facility, where it was compressed and then injected into two separate undersea reservoirs. The reservoirs are located in the Lower Quaternary Moebetsu (which consists of sandstone) and the Miocene Takinoue (which consists of volcanic and volclaniclastic rocks) formation, located 1000 to 1200m (3280 to 3940ft) and 2400 to 3000m (7875 to 9840ft) deep respectively. In the future the facility may serve as a trial site for transferring liquefied CO2 from vessels directly into the reservoirs.

After the 2018 Hokkaido Eastern Iburi earthquake a survey conducted by JCCS revealed that the reservoirs did not sustain any detectable damage, as well as no direct link between the earthquake and the CCS facility could be established.

Netherlands 
Developed in the Netherlands, an electrocatalysis by a copper complex helps reduce CO2 to oxalic acid.

Norway 
In Norway, the CO2 Technology Centre (TCM) at Mongstad began construction in 2009, and completed in 2012. It includes two capture technology plants (one advanced amine and one chilled ammonia), both capturing flue gas from two sources. This includes a gas-fired power plant and refinery cracker flue gas (similar to coal-fired power plant flue gas).

In addition to this, the Mongstad site was also planned to have a full-scale CCS demonstration plant. The project was delayed to 2014, 2018, and then indefinitely. The project cost rose to US$985 million. Then in October 2011, Aker Solutions' wrote off its investment in Aker Clean Carbon, declaring the carbon sequestration market to be "dead".

On 1 October 2013, Norway asked Gassnova, its Norwegian state enterprise for carbon capture and storage, not to sign any contracts for carbon capture and storage outside Mongstad.

In 2015 Norway was reviewing feasibility studies and hoping to have a full-scale carbon capture demonstration project by 2020.

In 2020, it then announced "Longship" ("Langskip" in Norwegian). This 2,7 billion CCS project will capture and store the carbon emissions of Norcem's cement factory in Brevik. Also, it plans to fund Fortum Oslo's Varme waste incineration facility. Finally, it will fund the transport and storage project "Northern Lights", a joint project between Equinor, Shell and Total. This latter project will transport liquid CO2 from capture facilities to a terminal at Øygarden in Vestland County. From there, CO2 will be pumped through pipelines to a reservoir beneath the seabed. The first two CO2 carrier ships for the Øygarden terminal were under construction at Dalian Shipbuilding in China in 2022. They are being equipped with rotor sails estimated to cut emissions by 5%. Øygarden is the world's first open-access transport and storage infrastructure.

Sleipner CO2 Injection 
Sleipner is a fully operational offshore gas field with CO2 injection initiated in 1996. CO2 is separated from produced gas and reinjected in the Utsira saline aquifer (800–1000 m below ocean floor) above the hydrocarbon reservoir zones. This aquifer extends much further north from the Sleipner facility at its southern extreme. The large size of the reservoir accounts for why 600 billion tonnes of CO2 are expected to be stored, long after the Sleipner natural gas project has ended. The Sleipner facility is the first project to inject its captured CO2 into a geological feature for the purpose of storage rather than economically compromising EOR.

United Arab Emirates 
After the success of their pilot plant operation in November 2011, the Abu Dhabi National Oil Company and Abu Dhabi Future Energy Company moved to create the first commercial CCS facility in the iron and steel industry. CO2 is a byproduct of the iron making process. It is transported via a 50 km pipeline to Abu Dhabi National Oil Company oil reserves for EOR. The facility's capacity is 800,000 tonnes per year. As  of 2013, more than 40% of gas emitted by the crude oil production process is recovered within the oil fields for EOR.

United Kingdom 
The government aims to capture and store 20-30 Mtpa by 2030, and over 50 Mtpa by 2035 (for comparison greenhouse gas emissions by the United Kingdom were 425 Mt in 2021). The 2020 budget allocated 800 million pounds to attempt to create CCS clusters by 2030, to capture CO2 from heavy industry and a gas-fired power station and store it under the North Sea. The Crown Estate is responsible for storage rights on the UK continental shelf and it has facilitated work on offshore CO2 storage technical and commercial issues, and the North Sea Transition Authority has awarded 6 undersea storage licences including to BP and Equinor.

A trial of bio-energy with carbon capture and storage (BECCS) at a wood-fired unit in Drax power station in the UK started in 2019. If successful this could remove one tonne per day of CO2 from the atmosphere, and the company aims for operations to start in 2027.

In the UK CCS is under consideration to help with industry and heating decarbonization, and it is hoped that building small modular units to fit to existing factories will lower the cost below the carbon price on the UK Emissions Trading Scheme, which was around 80 GBP per tonne in early 2022. Direct air capture is also still being considered, but as of 2022 is much too expensive.

In May 2022, it was announced that MOF Technologies had partnered with HeidelbergCement, Buzzi Unicem and Cementir Holding to build a point source carbon capture plant to further hard to abate industry decarbonization

United States 
In addition to individual carbon capture and sequestration projects, various programs work to research, develop, and deploy CCS technologies on a broad scale. These include the National Energy Technology Laboratory's (NETL) Carbon Sequestration Program, regional carbon sequestration partnerships and the Carbon Sequestration Leadership Forum (CSLF).

In September 2020, the U.S. Department Of Energy awarded $72 million in federal funding to support the development and advancement of carbon capture technologies. Under this cost-shared program, DOE awarded $51 million to nine new projects for coal and natural gas power and industrial sources.

The nine projects were to design initial engineering studies to develop technologies for byproducts at industrial sites. The projects selected are:

 Enabling Production of Low Carbon Emissions Steel Through CO2 Capture from Blast Furnace Gases — ArcelorMittal USA
 LH CO2MENT Colorado Project — Electricore
 Engineering Design of a Polaris Membrane CO2 Capture System at a Cement Plant — Membrane Technology and Research (MTR) Inc.
 Engineering Design of a Linde-BASF Advanced Post-Combustion CO2 Capture Technology at a Linde Steam Methane Reforming H2 Plant — Praxair
 Initial Engineering and Design for CO2 Capture from Ethanol Facilities — University of North Dakota Energy & Environmental Research Center
 Chevron Natural Gas Carbon Capture Technology Testing Project — Chevron USA, Inc.
 Engineering-scale Demonstration of Transformational Solvent on NGCC Flue Gas — ION Clean Energy Inc.
 Engineering-Scale Test of a Water-Lean Solvent for Post-Combustion Capture — Electric Power Research Institute Inc.
 Engineering Scale Design and Testing of Transformational Membrane Technology for CO2 Capture — Gas Technology Institute (GTI)

$21 million was also awarded to 18 projects for technologies that remove CO2 from the atmosphere. The focus was on the development of new materials for use in direct air capture and will also complete field testing. The projects:

 Direct Air Capture Using Novel Structured Adsorbents — Electricore
 Advanced Integrated Reticular Sorbent-Coated System to Capture CO2 from the Atmosphere — GE Research
 MIL-101(Cr)-Amine Sorbents Evaluation Under Realistic Direct Air Capture Conditions — Georgia Tech Research Corporation
 Demonstration of a Continuous-Motion Direct Air Capture System — Global Thermostat Operations, LLC
 Experimental Demonstration of Alkalinity Concentration Swing for Direct Air Capture of CO2 — Harvard University
 High-Performance, Hybrid Polymer Membrane for CO2 Separation from Ambient Air — InnoSense, LLC
 Transformational Sorbent Materials for a Substantial Reduction in the Energy Requirement for Direct Air Capture of CO2 — InnoSepra, LLC
 A Combined Water and CO2 Direct Air Capture System — IWVC, LLC
 TRAPS: Tunable, Rapid-uptake, AminoPolymer Aerogel Sorbent for Direct Air Capture of CO2 — Palo Alto Research Center
 Direct Air Capture Using Trapped Small Amines in Hierarchical Nanoporous Capsules on Porous Electrospun Hollow Fibers — Rensselaer Polytechnic Institute
 Development of Advanced Solid Sorbents for Direct Air Capture — RTI International
 Direct Air Capture Recovery of Energy for CCUS Partnership (DAC RECO2UP) — Southern States Energy Board
 Membrane Adsorbents Comprising Self-Assembled Inorganic Nanocages (SINCs) for Super-fast Direct Air Capture Enabled by Passive Cooling — SUNY
 Low Regeneration Temperature Sorbents for Direct Air Capture of CO2 — Susteon Inc.
 Next Generation Fiber-Encapsulated Nanoscale Hybrid Materials for Direct Air Capture with Selective Water Rejection — The Trustees of Columbia University in the City of New York
 Gradient Amine Sorbents for Low Vacuum Swing CO2 Capture at Ambient Temperature — The University of Akron
 Electrochemically-Driven CO2 Separation — University of Delaware
 Development of Novel Materials for Direct Air Capture of CO2 — University of Kentucky Research Foundation

Kemper Project, MS 2010-2021 
The Kemper Project is a gas-fired power plant under construction in Kemper County, Mississippi. It was originally planned as a coal-fired plant. Mississippi Power, a subsidiary of Southern Company, began construction in 2010. Had it become operational as a coal plant, the Kemper Project would have been a first-of-its-kind electricity plant to employ gasification and carbon capture technologies at this scale. The emission target was to reduce CO2 to the same level an equivalent natural gas plant would produce. However, in June 2017 the proponents – Southern Company and Mississippi Power – announced that the plant would only burn natural gas.

Construction was delayed and the scheduled opening was pushed back over two years, while the cost increased to $6.6 billion—three times the original estimate. According to a Sierra Club analysis, Kemper is the most expensive power plant ever built for the watts of electricity it will generate.

In October 2021, the coal gasification portion of the plant was demolished.

Terrell Natural Gas Processing Plant 
Opening in 1972, the Terrell plant in Texas, United States was the oldest operating industrial CCS project as of 2017. CO2 is captured during gas processing and transported primarily via the Val Verde pipeline where it is eventually injected at Sharon Ridge oil field and other secondary sinks for use in EOR. The facility captures an average of somewhere between 0.4 and 0.5 million tons of CO2 per annum.

Enid Fertilizer 
Beginning in 1982, the facility owned by the Koch Nitrogen company is the second oldest large scale CCS facility still in operation. The CO2 that is captured is a high purity byproduct of nitrogen fertilizer production. The process is made economical by transporting the CO2 to oil fields for EOR.

Shute Creek Gas Processing Facility 
7 million metric tonnes of CO2 are recovered annually from ExxonMobil's Shute Creek gas processing plant near La Barge, Wyoming, and transported by pipeline to various oil fields for EOR. Started in 1986, as of 2017 this project had the second largest CO2 capture capacity in the world.

Petra Nova (2017-2020)
The Petra Nova project is a billion dollar endeavor undertaken by NRG Energy and JX Nippon to partially retrofit their jointly owned W.A Parish coal-fired power plant with post-combustion carbon capture. The plant, which is located in Thompsons, Texas (just outside of Houston), entered commercial service in 1977. Carbon capture began on 10 January 2017. The WA Parish unit 8 generates 240 MW and 90% of the CO2 (or 1.4 million tonnes) was captured per year. The CO2 (99% purity) is compressed and piped about 82 miles to West Ranch Oil Field, Texas, for EOR. The field has a capacity of 60 million barrels of oil and has increased its production from 300 barrels per day to 4000 barrels daily.  On 1 May 2020, NRG shut down Petra Nova, citing low oil prices during the COVID-19 pandemic. The plant had also reportedly suffered frequent outages and missed its carbon sequestration goal by 17% over its first three years of operation. In  2021 the plant was mothballed.

Illinois Industrial, Decatur IL 
 the Illinois Industrial Carbon Capture and Storage project in Decatur, Illinois is dedicated to geological CO2 storage. The public-private research project spearheaded by Archer Daniels Midland Co received a 171 million dollar investment from the DOE and over 66 million dollars from the private sector. The CO2 is a byproduct of the fermentation process of corn ethanol production and is stored 7000 feet underground in the Mt. Simon Sandstone saline aquifer. Sequestration began in April 2017 with a carbon capture capacity of 1 Mt/a.

NET Power Demonstration Facility, La Porte TX 
, the NET Power Demonstration Facility in La Porte, TX was an oxy-combustion natural gas power plant that operated by the Allam power cycle. The plant was able to reduce its air emissions to zero by producing a near pure stream of CO2. and first fired in May 2018.

Century Plant, TX 
, Occidental Petroleum, along with SandRidge Energy, operated a West Texas hydrocarbon gas processing plant and related pipeline infrastructure that provides CO2 for Enhanced Oil Recovery (EOR). With a CO2 capture capacity of 8.4 Mt/a, the Century plant was the largest single industrial source CO2 capture facility in the world.

Developing projects by several countries

ANICA - Advanced Indirectly Heated Carbonate Looping Process 
The ANICA Project is focused on developing economically feasible carbon capture technology for lime and cement plants, which are responsible for 5% of the total anthropogenic carbon dioxide emissions. In 2019, a consortium of 12 partners from Germany, United Kingdom and Greece began working on integrating indirectly heated carbonate lopping (IHCaL) process in cement and lime production. The project aims at lowering the energy penalty and CO2 avoidance costs for CO2 capture from lime and cement plants.

Port of Rotterdam CCUS Backbone Initiative 
Expected in 2021, the Port of Rotterdam CCUS Backbone Initiative aimed to implement a "backbone" of shared CCS infrastructure for use by businesses located around the Port of Rotterdam in Rotterdam, Netherlands. The project is overseen by the Port of Rotterdam, natural gas company Gasunie, and the EBN. It intends to capture and sequester 2 million tons of CO2 per year and increase this number in future years. Although dependent on the participation of companies, the goal of this project is to greatly reduce the carbon footprint of the industrial sector of the Port of Rotterdam and establish a successful CCS infrastructure in the Netherlands following the recently canceled ROAD project. CO2 captured from local chemical plants and refineries will both be sequestered in the North Sea seabed. The possibility of a CCU initiative has also been considered, in which the captured CO2 will be sold to horticultural firms, who will use it to speed up plant growth, as well as other industrial users.

Climeworks Direct Air Capture Plant and CarbFix2 Project 
Climeworks opened the first commercial direct air capture plant in Zürich, Switzerland in 2008. Their process captures CO2 from ambient air using a patented filter, isolates the CO2 at high heat, and transports it to a nearby greenhouse as a fertilizer. The plant is built near a waste recovery facility that provides excess heat to power the plant.

Climeworks is also working with Reykjavik Energy on the CarbFix2 project with EU funding. This project, called "Orca," is located in Hellisheidi, Iceland. It uses direct air capture technology in conjunction with a large geothermal power plant. Once CO2 is captured using Climeworks' filters, it is heated using heat from the geothermal plant and used to carbonate water. The geothermal plant then pumps the carbonated water into underground rock formations where the CO2 reacts with basaltic bedrock and forms carbonate minerals for permanent storage.

OPEN100 
The OPEN100 project, launched in 2020 by the Energy Impact Center (EIC), is the world's first open-source blueprint for nuclear power plant deployment. The Energy Impact Center and OPEN100 aim to reverse climate change by 2040 and believe that nuclear power is the only feasible energy source to power CCS without the compromise of releasing new CO2.

This project intends to bring together researchers, designers, scientists, engineers, think tanks, etc. to help compile research and designs that will eventually evolve into a blueprint that is available to the public and can be utilized in the development of future nuclear plants.

Nuada 
MOF Technologies have developed Nuada, a modular point source carbon capture technology, which uses metal-organic frameworks (MOFs) to deliver energy-efficient  removal at a fraction of the cost of conventional amines. After having been selected by the Global Cement and Concrete Association via their Innovandi Open Challenge, Nuada will partner with HeidelbergCement, Buzzi Unicem and Cementir Holding to build pilot plants in 2022.

References

External links 
DOE Fossil Energy Department of Energy programs in CO2 capture and storage
US Department of Energy
Zero Emissions Platform - technical adviser to the EU Commission on the deployment of CCS and CCU
National Assessment of Geologic CO2 Storage Resources: Results United States Geological Survey
MIT Carbon Capture and Sequestration Project Database, until 2016 
MIT Carbon Capture and Sequestration private public project

 List
Bright green environmentalism
Emissions reduction
Gas technologies